Ichoria maura is a moth of the subfamily Arctiinae. It was described by Max Wilhelm Karl Draudt in 1915. It is found in Venezuela.

References

 

Arctiinae
Moths described in 1915